Oliver Simmons (January 29, 1835 – November 11, 1903) was a Canadian politician.

The son of Judge Solomon Simmons of Will County, Illinois, Simmons was born in Chagrin Falls, Ohio, United States. He was mayor of Petrolia, Ontario from 1892 to 1893. He was elected to the House of Commons of Canada for the electoral district of Lambton East. A Conservative, he died in office in 1903.

References
 
 Short sketches with photographs of the wardens, parliamentary representatives, judicial officers and county officials of the county of Lambton... : from 1852 to 1917

1835 births
1903 deaths
American emigrants to pre-Confederation Ontario
Conservative Party of Canada (1867–1942) MPs
Members of the House of Commons of Canada from Ontario
People from Chagrin Falls, Ohio